Hong Kong participated at the 2018 Summer Youth Olympics in Buenos Aires, Argentina from 6 to 18 October 2018.

Competitors

Aquatics

Swimming 
 Boys - Nicholas Lim (LRC), Mok Kai Tik Marcus (WTS)
 Girls - Ho Nam Wai (WTS), Kan Cheuk Tung Natalie (HVA)

Athletics

Beach handball

Equestrian

Hong Kong qualified a rider at the FEI World Jumping Challenge 2nd Competition Category A.

 Individual Jumping - Ho Yuen, Edgar Fung

Fencing

Hong Kong qualified four athletes based on its performance at the 2018 Cadet World Championship.

 Boys' Foil - Chan Pak Hei
 Girls' Épée - Kaylin Hsieh
 Girls' Foil - Christelle Joy Ko
 Girls' Sabre - Ma Ho Chee

Rowing

Hong Kong qualified one boat based on his performance at the 2018 Asian Youth Olympic Games Qualification Regatta.

 Boys' single sculls - 1 athlete

Sailing

Hong Kong qualified two boats based on their performance at the 2017 World Techno 293+ Championships.

 Boys' Techno 293+ - 1 boat
 Girls' Techno 293+ - 1 boat

Table tennis

Hong Kong qualified one table tennis player based on her performance at the Road to Buenos Aires (Europe) series.

 Girls' singles - Lee Ka Yee

Triathlon

Hong Kong qualified two athletes based on its performance at the 2018 Asian Youth Olympic Games Qualifier.

Individual

Relay

References

2018 in Hong Kong sport
Nations at the 2018 Summer Youth Olympics
Hong Kong at the Youth Olympics